Ulster Savings Bank is a mutual savings bank headquartered in Kingston, New York. The bank has 14 branches, all of which are in Ulster County, Orange County, or Dutchess County.

History
The bank was founded on April 13, 1851.

Archibald Russell (father of Archibald D. Russell) was the first president of the bank; he served until 1870.

Between 1858 and 1868, deposits grew from $21,982 to $646,922 as the population of Kingston grew from 15,000 to 20,000.

In 1891, the treasurer and assistant treasurer of the bank were accused of stealing more than $400,000, resulting in the temporary closure of the bank. Both received prison sentences as a result of their actions in 1892.

In 1892, John B. Alliger was named treasurer of the bank. At that time, the bank had $1.835 million in deposits. By 1916, the bank had $5.135 million in deposits.

In 1896, Alton B. Parker was named president of the bank and served until his resignation in 1904.

In September 2011, Lisa Marie Cathie was named president and chief executive officer of the bank, succeeding Marjorie Rovereto.

In 2015, Glenn B. Sutherland replaced Lisa Marie Cathie as president and chief executive officer.

In January 2016, the bank opened a branch in Newburgh, New York.

In June 2016, William C. Calderara was named president and chief executive officer of the bank.

In November 2016, a lawsuit alleged that the bank discriminated against African-American borrowers by offering them less favorable loan terms than white borrowers, in violation of the Fair Housing Act.

References

Banks established in 1851
Banks based in New York (state)
Organizations based in New York (state)
Kingston, New York
Ulster County, New York
1851 establishments in New York (state)